Putnam Hall School (opened for pupils Sept 1871; closed 1940) is a bygone notable nonsectarian boarding school for girls formerly located in Poughkeepsie, New York.

History 
 Predecessor school, Brooks Seminary

 Putnam Hall was the successor to an earlier nonsectarian girls boarding school on the same property.  It was named Brooks Seminary for Young Ladies.  Brooks Seminary was founded September 1871 – not long after the opening of Vassar College.  Mary Bryan Johnson (maiden) was its founder.  She and her future husband, Edward White, erected a building on six acres of elevated grounds in the southeastern section of Poughkeepsie at the corner of what then was Southeast and Hanscom Avenues.  Due to competition from Vassar Preparatory School, Brooks Seminary moved to 11 Montague Terrace, Brooklyn, New York, around 1880.  The last news article of a Brooks Seminary commencement was June 11, 1881 — New York Herald-Tribune.

 Putnam Hall School

 After an interval of use as a hotel and Vassar dormitory, the Poughkeepsie building and property again launched as a new girls' boarding school in about 1901 under the name of Putnam Hall.

 Bartlett Park

 Miss Ellen Clizbe Bartlett, who presided as proprietor and principal of Putnam Hall when it closed in 1940, donated the six acres to the city of Poughkeepsie.  It is now a city park, known as Bartlett Park.

Former directors and leadership
Directors and leadership of Brooks Seminary

 Edmund P. Platt (b. 2 Dec 1843; Poughkeepsie), director
 Mary Bryan White  Johnson, proprietor & head of school, Brooks Seminary
 Mrs. Hanks (capacity not known)
 Amy Johnson, teacher
 Miss Minna Hinkle ( –1929), teacher of French and German

Directors and leadership of Putnam Hall School
 Miss Ellen Clizbe Bartlett (A.B., Elmira College) (1864–1944), principal since 1905 and connected with the school since 1901

References 

Defunct girls' schools in the United States
Defunct schools in New York (state)
Educational institutions disestablished in 1940
Girls' schools in New York City
Poughkeepsie, New York